Robert Bradley Holley (born November 14, 1958), also known by the Korean name Ha Il (하일), is a naturalized South Korean lawyer and television personality. A native of California and a former U.S. citizen, Holley relinquished his birth citizenship in 1997 in order to take South Korean citizenship.

Career
Holley first came to South Korea in 1978 as a missionary of the Church of Jesus Christ of Latter-day Saints, remaining there for two years. He returned to the country in 1982 to study at Yonsei University, and after graduating from West Virginia University in 1987 with a J.D. degree, began pursuing a legal career in South Korea. He founded the Kwangju Foreign School in 1996. He began his rise to television stardom in the early 2000s, becoming well known for his spoken Korean which shows heavy influence from the Gyeongsang dialect spoken in his adopted hometown of Busan.

Personal life
Holley is a descendant of William Bradford, one of the signatories of the Mayflower Compact. He is married to a South Korean woman, with whom he has three sons; the eldest was born in 1988. He decided to naturalize as a South Korean citizen in 1997, which required him to give up his U.S. citizenship. He has described this as a difficult decision, especially since at the time South Korea was not a member of the U.S. Visa Waiver Program; a U.S. consular official tried to discourage him from giving up citizenship, warning that he might not be able to get a visa to return to his country of birth, but Holley nevertheless decided to go through with it. A notice confirming his loss of U.S. citizenship was published in the Federal Register in February 1998. He is a close friend of Lee Joon-gi, who rose to fame in the mid-2000s as a film actor.

On April 10, 2019, Holley was arrested by the Cyber Investigation Division of the Gyeonggi-do Southern Region Police Department on the charge of using methamphetamines pursuant to the Narcotics Control Act . He was released the same day after a court ruled that he had a low chance of destroying evidence. His case was referred to the prosecution on May 1, 2019. On August 29, 2019, at the Seoul Western District Court, Holley was given a one-year prison sentence suspended for two years and 40 hours of drug treatment. The sentence took into consideration the fact that Holley had expressed regret for using methamphetamines.

References

External links

1958 births
Living people
American emigrants to South Korea
American Mormon missionaries in South Korea
Naturalized citizens of South Korea
Former United States citizens
20th-century South Korean lawyers
21st-century South Korean lawyers
South Korean television personalities
West Virginia State University alumni
Yonsei University alumni
Yeongdo Ha clan
Latter Day Saints from California